Antanas Juozapavičius (13 February 1894 – 13 February 1919) was the first officer of the Army of the Republic of Lithuania to die while fighting in the Lithuanian Wars of Independence.

Biography 
Antanas Juozapavičius was born to Juozapas Juozapavičius and his wife Marijona Juozapavičienė. He was born in the small Švakštonys manor, which the parents were renting. As farming was financially unsuccessful, the family emigrated to Riga, where Juozapas Juozapavičius worked as a wagoner.

In Tartu, he educated to become a pharmacist, and from 1914 onwards worked as such in the pharmacies of Riga and Tartu.

World War I 

After World War I started, in 1915 he enlisted as a volunteer of the Imperial Russian Army. In 1916 he completed the Gatchina machine gunner's school and promptly returned to his regiment.

In the ranks of the Latvian Riflemen 
In the fights for Riga with Germans, he was injured and subsequently treated in Riga. He was awarded the 4th class of the Order of Saint Anna.

After the February Revolution 
In 1917 June in Smolensk, after healing in the hospital, he was active in the committee for the organisation of Lithuanian military units.

Lithuanian Wars of Independence 
Antanas Juozapavičius returned to Lithuania in June 1918. From 24 November 1918 he was the adjutant of the country's Defence Minister Augustinas Voldemaras. Later he was assigned to the 1st Infantry Regiment, which was moved from Vilnius to Alytus on 18 December 1918. When  and Kazys Ladiga, who disapproved of the former's leadership, were removed from the regiment, Antanas Juozapavičius was made the temporary regimental commander on 4 February 1919.

Death 
He was wounded on the bridge of Alytus during the Battle of Alytus on his 25th birthday, when the regiment had to retreat for fear of encirclement, as the neighbouring allied German soldiers unexpectedly retreated. However, Lithuanians quickly retook control of Alytus.

Burial 

References

More reading 

 Petras Biržys. Karininkas Antanas Juozapavičius, 1923 m.
 Karolis Dineika. Lietuvos karžygys Antanas Juozapavičius, 1926 m.
 Karininkas Antanas Juozapavičius, 1894 02 13 – 1919 02 13 (sud. Jonas Aničas). – 2-asis papild. ir patais. leid. – Vilnius: LR krašto apsaugos ministerija, 2004. – 124 p.: iliustr. – 
 https://luksas.wordpress.com/2011/02/11/karininkas-tapes-legenda/

Lithuanian Army officers
Latvian Riflemen
Russian military personnel of World War I
1894 births
1919 deaths
Military personnel killed in action